Teenage Mutant Ninja Turtles Shell Shock is a Gerstlauer Sky Fly ride operating at Nickelodeon Universe at Mall of America in Bloomington, Minnesota. Teenage Mutant Ninja Turtles Shell Shock opened on March 17, 2012, and was the first of its kind in the United States. The ride was installed by Ride Entertainment Group, who handles all of Gerstlauer's operations in the Western Hemisphere.

Summary
Riders enter through a queue themed to look like the Ninja Turtles' underground sewer headquarters before boarding the ride vehicles, which feature the turtles' shells and their weapons on the back. Once the 12 single-rider gondolas are carried up, the gondola brakes are released and guests are able to control the rotation of their vehicles.

History
On July 25, 2011, the Park Thoughts podcast interviewed the marketing director of Nickelodeon Universe, and confirmed that a new major attraction was in the works for the 2012 season. On January 20, 2012, Nickelodeon Universe announced Teenage Mutant Ninja Turtles Shell Shock for the 2012 season, and was expected to open in March 2012. The attraction replaced Tak Attack, which closed on November 14, 2011.

On March 16, 2012, around 1:00 pm, the ride malfunctioned, causing it to freeze in the air. The ride held 12 people, all of which were okay. It took ride developers about 15–20 minutes until they were able unfreeze the ride, bringing all passengers safely down. The ride passengers included four children and 8 adults. The ride continued to occasionally freeze in air throughout the first week of operation.

On March 16, 2012, at around 2:30 pm, the ride froze in operation, taking ride operators over 10 minutes to get passengers down. The ride at that time was holding 11 passengers (two children and 9 adults). The ride was then closed and re-opened two hours later.

On March 17, 2012, the attraction officially opened several months before the premiere of the television series that it's themed to. Nickelodeon Universe hosted a Be A Part of Turtles History at Nickelodeon Universe! event to conduct the Guinness World Record for the Largest Gathering of Ninja Turtles. The record was broken on March 17, 2012, with 836 people dressed up as Ninja Turtles in front of the ride. The previous record for the largest gathering of Ninja Turtles was set at Rutgers University in 2008 with 786 people.

See also
 2012 in amusement parks

References

External links
Sky Ride Information at Gerstlauer's official website

Nickelodeon Universe
Amusement rides introduced in 2012
Amusement rides manufactured by Gerstlauer
Nickelodeon in amusement parks
Shell Shock
2012 establishments in Minnesota